Scopula leuculata is a moth of the family Geometridae. It was described by Snellen in 1874. It is endemic to Colombia.

References

Moths described in 1874
leuculata
Endemic fauna of Colombia
Moths of South America